Jabal Aqd is a sub-district located in Al Makhadir District, Ibb Governorate, Yemen. Jabal Aqd had a population of  18237 as of 2004.

References 

Sub-districts in Al Makhadir District